Bouca Airport  is an airstrip serving Bouca, a village in the Ouham prefecture of the Central African Republic.

The airstrip is within the northern section of the village, alongside the RN4 road. There are houses close to the south end of the runway.

See also

Transport in the Central African Republic
List of airports in the Central African Republic

References

External links 
OpenStreetMap - Bouca
OurAirports - Bouca Airport

Airports in the Central African Republic
Buildings and structures in Ouham